The 1994 Big Ten Conference baseball tournament was held at C. O. Brown Stadium in Battle Creek, Michigan, from May 15 through 19. The top four teams from the regular season participated in the double-elimination tournament, the fourteenth annual tournament sponsored by the Big Ten Conference to determine the league champion.  won their second tournament championship and earned the Big Ten Conference's automatic bid to the 1994 NCAA Division I baseball tournament.

Format and seeding 
The 1994 tournament was a 4-team double-elimination tournament, with seeds determined by conference regular season winning percentage only. Michigan and Michigan State claimed the third and fourth seeds, respectively, by tiebreakers.

Tournament 

* - Indicates game required 12 innings.

All-Tournament Team 
The following players were named to the All-Tournament Team.

Most Outstanding Player 
Mike Repasky was named Most Outstanding Player. Repasky was an outfielder for Ohio State.

References 

Tournament
Big Ten Baseball Tournament
Big Ten Conference Baseball
Big Ten baseball tournament